Dračevica was a county (župa), a small region in medieval Bosnia, located in the mountainous areas to the northwest of Boka Kotorska and the town of Herceg Novi, today in Montenegro. It corresponds to the Sutorina region.

References

Medieval Montenegro
Bay of Kotor
Subdivisions of Serbia in the Middle Ages
Historical regions in Montenegro
Župas of the medieval Bosnian state